James Henry Bloodworth (July 26, 1917 – August 17, 2002) was a professional baseball second baseman who played in Major League Baseball (MLB) for the Washington Senators (1937 and 1939–41), Detroit Tigers (1942–43 and 1946), Pittsburgh Pirates (1947), Cincinnati Reds (1949–50), and Philadelphia Phillies (1950–51).

Early life
Bloodworth was born in Tallahassee, Florida, and he grew up in Apalachicola. Bloodworth said that he strengthened his upper body as a youth by pulling boats across Apalachicola Bay. He played local baseball with an adult team. He was 17 when he started his minor-league career with affiliates of the Washington Senators.

Career
Bloodworth made his major-league debut in 1937 and began to play regularly in 1939. In 1941, Bloodworth led AL second basemen in putouts and assists. That December, he was traded to the Detroit Tigers. He led the American League in grounding into double plays (29) in 1943. He served in the Florida Army National Guard. He missed the entire 1944 and 1945 seasons due to his military service, returning to the Tigers in 1946.

Bloodworth was traded to the Pirates in December 1946 and to the Dodgers about a year later. He was traded to the Reds in 1948 before being purchased by the Phillies in 1950. He was on the 1950 Phillies team that won the 1950 NL pennant. He played in one game in the 1950 World Series; as a ninth-inning defensive replacement, he did not get any plate appearances.

Bloodworth's last major-league season was with the 1951 Phillies. In 11 seasons, he played in 1,002 games and had a .248 batting average over 3,519 at bats with 62 home runs and 451 RBI. Bloodworth returned to the minor leagues, where he had stints as a player and player-manager for teams in Cedar Rapids and Spartanburg.

Later life
Bloodworth, who lived in Apalachicola during the baseball offseasons, continued to live there after his baseball career. He began to experience heart failure in the late 1970s. He died in 2002.

References

Further reading

External links

Jimmy Bloodworth at SABR (Baseball BioProject)

1917 births
2002 deaths
Baseball players from Tallahassee, Florida
Cedar Rapids Indians players
Charlotte Hornets (baseball) players
Chattanooga Lookouts players
Cincinnati Reds players
Columbia Senators players
Detroit Tigers players
Florida National Guard personnel
Indianapolis Indians players
International League MVP award winners
Major League Baseball second basemen
Minor league baseball managers
Montreal Royals players
Washington Senators (1901–1960) players
Panama City Pilots players
Philadelphia Phillies players
Pittsburgh Pirates players
Spartanburg Peaches players
Springfield Nationals players
United States Army personnel of World War II
People from Apalachicola, Florida